was a Japanese film director best known for his movies in the "Violent pink" subgenre of the Pink film, such as Assault! Jack the Ripper (1976), Rape! (1976), Rape! 13th Hour (1977) and Raping! (1978). Earlier genre films directed by Hasebe include Black Tight Killers (1966) and the Alleycat Rock series (1970).

Life and career

Early life
Hasebe recalled a trusting relationship with his father, whom he considered the biggest influence on his life. In the post-war years, Hasebe was influenced strongly by American and French films, particularly American "B" movies, and the films of John Huston and Samuel Fuller. After studying French literature at Waseda University, he began working at Nikkatsu studios in 1958. For eight years he worked as an assistant director, including a lengthy apprenticeship under Seijun Suzuki. He was given his first chance to direct in 1966 with Black Tight Killers. He directed more action genre films in the 1960s including the fourth film in the Singing Gunman series, starring Akira Kobayashi, and Massacre Gun with Jo Shishido.

Alleycat Rock
In 1970, Nikkatsu wanted to create a youth-oriented series and chose Hasebe to supervise the first film in what would be the popular Alleycat Rock series. The studio gave him considerable freedom in the direction of the first film, Alleycat Rock: Female Boss (1970), and, under the pseudonym "Takashi Fujii", Hasebe co-wrote the story as well. Meiko Kaji was the supporting actress in the first entry in the series, but became the star of the remaining films. Though mainly known for his later "violent pink" films, some call this series Hasebe's best work, "ultra-chic, yet surprisingly grim."

The Alleycat Rock series came to an end when Kaji left Nikkatsu to join Toei studios and star in the Female Prisoner: Scorpion series and Lady Snowblood (1973). Hasebe also left Nikkatsu in late 1971, when the studio decided to compete with the Pink film genre, and produce almost nothing but softcore pornographic films which Nikkatsu labeled "Roman Porno". Hasebe later commented, "to be honest, I am not good at making sex films."

Hasebe worked mainly in television in the early 1970s, including the series Spectreman. He returned to Nikkatsu to make Naked Seven (1974), a financially and critically successful parody of Kurosawa's Seven Samurai, and an informal sequel to the Alleycat Rock series. Also in 1974, he directed an homage to Clint Eastwood's Dirty Harry character in Sukeban Deka: Dirty Mary. Though well-regarded today, this film was a major financial failure at the time, and damaged Hasebe's reputation for a couple of years.

"Violent pink"
When Nikkatsu offered him a chance to leave TV and create a new genre of pink film in 1976, Hasebe was at first reluctant. Not interested in directing typical sex films, Hasebe instead conceived of the "Violent pink" genre. The Weissers, in their Japanese Cinema Encyclopedia: The Sex Films describe the Violent pink" films as "vicious and mean-spirited productions, without delving into the more traditional whip-n-bondage aspects of the S&M genre", and compare the genre to the American "roughies." Warning the studio about his intentions, Hasebe asked "Are you sure you want me? You must be aware--my craft is very bloody." Nikkatsu, desperate at the time for a new direction for their Roman porno films, agreed to give him creative freedom. Though "highly controversial and recommended with some obvious reservations", most critics judge Hasebe's "violent pink" films the best of his career.

Hasebe's first true Roman porno, the "violent pink" Rape! (1976) became a hit, and Nikkatsu let him continue making similar films. Hasebe recalled, "In '76, I made three genre films back to back, Rape!, Assault! Jack The Ripper and Rape! 13th Hour. I'm not sure these were great films, but the ticket sales were remarkable. It was wonderful to be a busy, successful director again."

The last of these three films has been called, "the pinnacle of this genre, a movie long-considered the most offensive, the most grotesque movie of all time." Nikkatsu, fearful of governmental action if Hasebe continued becoming more extreme in his films, assigned producer Ryoji Ito to watch him on the set. Recalling this situation later, Hasebe laughed and said, "Rape! 13th Hour... remains one of Producer Ito's favorites. Ultimately, I guess the company misjudged our tagteam effect."

Some contemporary critics interpreted these films as commentaries and satires on the state of film-making in Japan at the time. Hasebe denied such intentions on his part, but did not rule out the possibility that producer Ito and the script-writer may have had this in mind. Hasebe rejected the idea that cinematic violence incites violence in the audience, saying, "I believe [film violence] has no effect on an audience. Personally, I can attest to this fact. I do not become aggressive when I watch a violent movie. I can not imagine such a correlation... When I was very young, we admired Humphrey Bogart for his dandyism, but not for his killing. We did not accept the formula. We knew that killing somebody wouldn't make us become him. Why? Because we knew it was just a goddamn movie and he was just an actor and none of his victims were really dead."

Though the controversial Rape! 13th Hour had been a box-office hit, Nikkatsu decided to curtail the ultra-violence in their Roman porno films after its release. Kōyū Ohara's Zoom Up: Rape Site (1980) would later begin another wave of "Violent pink" Nikkatsu Roman porno films. Hasebe softened his touch for his next film, Secret Honeymoon: Rape Train (1977), which was more typical of Nikkatsu's Roman porno style, and called an "erotic film emphasizing warmth and human drama." His next film, Attacked!! (1978), compared to Rape! 13th Hour, has been judged "still deplorable, but not nearly as repulsive as the former notorious entry." Also in 1978, Hasebe directed Erotic Liaisons, a modern adaptation of Choderlos de Laclos's 18th-century epistolary novel Les Liaisons dangereuses, which pink film director, Kōji Wakamatsu would also film in 1992.

After leaving Nikkatsu in the late 1970s, Hasebe worked for Toei, where he directed several V-cinema films in the 1990s. When interviewed in 1999, Hasebe was a grandfather, living in comfortable semi-retirement in Tokyo. Hasebe died of pneumonia on June 14, 2009.

Filmography

Films

Television series
 Spectreman (Supekutoruman aka Uchû enjin gori) (1971)
 Tokusō Saizensen (1977)
 Daitsuiseki (1978) (episodes 1, 2, 5, 6)
 Tantei Monogatari (1979) (episodes 8 and 10)
 Pro Hunter (1980) (episodes 2, 4 , 11, 12, 21 and 22)
 Abunai Deka (1986)
 Aibō (2000)

Notes

Sources
 
 Hasebe, Yasuharu. (1998). Interviewed by Thomas and Yuko Mihara Weisser in Tokyo, 1999, in Asian Cult Cinema, #25, 4th Quarter, 1999, p. 32-42.
 
 
 

1932 births
2009 deaths
Japanese film directors
Yakuza film directors
Pink film directors
Deaths from pneumonia in Japan